The 2002 FIA GT Donington 500 km was the ninth round the 2002 FIA GT Championship season.  It took place at Donington Park, United Kingdom, on 6 October 2002.

Official results
Class winners in bold.  Cars failing to complete 70% of winner's distance marked as Not Classified (NC).

Statistics
 Pole position – #22 BMS Scuderia Italia – 1:28.982
 Fastest lap – #22 BMS Scuderia Italia – 1:30.444
 Average speed – 151.100 km/h

References

 
 
 

D
Donington
October 2002 sports events in the United Kingdom